Franqueville may refer to several communes in France:

Franqueville, Aisne
Franqueville, Eure
Franqueville, Somme
Franqueville-Saint-Pierre, in the Seine-Maritime département